Uncle Urfi was a Pakistan Television Corporation serial drama which first aired in 1972.

It had such a powerful appeal for the people of all age-groups that it turned into an instant hit. The serial has 26 episodes (each with a running time of 30-minutes) and it used to be telecast weekly by Pakistan Television Corporation.

Written by Hasina Moin and directed by Mohsin Ali and Shirin Vaqar Azim. The lead role was played by Shakeel as Uncle Urfi — a Pakistani expatriate in Canada who returns to Pakistan — and the character of Beena, the heroine, was performed by Shahla Ahmad. The supporting character of Hasnat, played by Jamshed Ansari, with his penknife, soon was the talk of the town and echoes of which could be heard even today. In fact, the whole serial was supported by a strong talented cast. All in all, good acting, powerful script and skilled direction helped accomplish one of the most celebrated productions of PTV.

Synopsis
As the story goes, Shakeel, who is smartly dubbed as Uncle Urfi, takes interest in Beena. In reality, Uncle Urfi wishes to make Beena happy. Logically, Urfi should have taken Beena into confidence before doing her a favor. Instead, he kept her in the dark. The final moments of the last episode are fraught with pain and pathos.

Urfi tells Beena with certitude, hamari shadi hogi to sara zamana deikhey ga. To which poor Beena replies, kuchh shadiyaan dil kay weerano mein bhi to ho jaati hain, sirif khuda gawah hota hai.

The emotionally charged conclusion of Uncle Urfi, was so unexpected that literally nobody was prepared for it. Indeed, Haseena Moin had instilled so much despair in its dialogues that thirty-two years later in 2004, it still stands as a classic in its bittersweet illustration of the unbreakable bond of family.

Cast
 Shakeel as Irfanuddin Ahmed also known as Uncle Urfi (Guardian of Afsheen) 
 Shahla Ahmad as Beena, Uncle Urfi's love interest
 Nahid Rafique as Afsheen (Uncle Urfi's friend's daughter)
 Azra Sherwani as Ghazi Aapa, sister of Uncle Urfi
 Khursheed Shahid as Flight attendant
 Qurban Jillani as Manzoor Uncle/Shaheed Bhai, brother-in-law of Uncle Urfi
 Jamshed Ansari as Hasnat Ahmed, cousin of Afsheen
 Begum Khurshid Mirza as Amma Bi, the mother of Manzoor Uncle
 Akbar Subhani as Mansoor, the son of Ghazi Apa and Shaheed Bhai
 Rehana Parveen as Azra, the daughter of Ghazi Apa and Shaheed Bhai
 Ishrat Hashmi as Afsheen's aunt
 Subhani ba Yunus as Afsheen's uncle
 Imtiaz Ahmed as Beena's father, Abrar
 Qaiser Naqvi as Beena's mother
 Khalid Nizami as head of Uncle Urfi's household
 Syed Zahid Ali as Uncle Urfi's secretary
 Raju Jamil (Zulqarnain Jamil Aali son of Jamiluddin Aali in real life) as Police Inspector in episode 2 and as Zafar in episode 5/6 
 Mushtaq Ahmed as Zuby's Daddy
 Salma Aziz as Zuby
 S. M. Saleem as Baray Mian
 Khurshid Talat as Ambreen
 Khurshed Ahmad as Jimmy
 Ghazala Malik as Air Hostess 1
 Naseem Aziz as Air Hostess 2
 Rafat Jamil as Flight Steward
 Tayyab Ali as Doctor
 Rafiq Ahmad as officer
 Sikandar Hayat as the mulaazim
 Shehnaz Ismail as Fazeelat/Fuzzy (who Uncle Urfi referred to as "khatoon"
 Mehboob as Dada Jaan

References

External links
Uncle Urfi (PTV drama - episode 1) on YouTube

1970s Pakistani television series
1972 Pakistani television series debuts
Pakistan Television Corporation original programming
Pakistani drama television series